Bass Strait Ferries have been the ships that have been used for regular transport across Bass Strait between Tasmania and Victoria in mainland Australia, as well as the various attempts to link Tasmania with Sydney.  Historically, some regular shipping services in the twentieth century linked Sydney, Melbourne and Hobart with the Bass Strait ports: Launceston's various port locations, Devonport and Burnie. The distinction between coastal shipping and Bass Strait ferry has been blurred at times.

At various stages the cost of shipping between Tasmania and the Australian mainland have caused enquiries and calls for subsidies or reduced rates of both ferries and general shipping.

History
In the 1840s the Launceston–Melbourne Steam Navigation Company was in business with Black Swan, Royal Shepherd and Havilah.  The Shamrock at this time was engaged in a service between Sydney, Melbourne and Launceston

Tasmanian Steamers commenced in the 1920s with three ships.

In 1959 the Australian National Line took over the service, and from 1959 to 1972, the  made crossings between Melbourne and Devonport.

From 1965 to 1972, the  made three crossings per fortnight from Sydney to Hobart, Bell Bay and Burnie. In 1972 the Empress replaced the Princess on the Melbourne to Devonport route and the Australian Trader moved to the Sydney-Tasmania routes.

The Tasmanian Government's TT-Line took over the service from 1985 when the  replaced the Empress and made six weekly overnight crossings between Devonport and Melbourne. It was replaced by the Spirit of Tasmania in 1993.

In the summer months of 1998 to 2002, TT-Line in conjunction with SeaCat Tasmania, also operated the high speed catamaran Devil Cat between Port Welshpool, 200 kilometres south east of Melbourne and George Town near Bell Bay. The trip took six hours. 

Flinders island can also be reached by ferry from Bridport in Tasmania, and from Port Welshpool in Victoria.

2002 - Spirit of Tasmania I, II, III
From January 2004 to June 2006 a third ship, operated on the Devonport to Sydney route.

2022 - Spirit of Tasmania IV, V
On 28 February 2022, Rauma Marine Constructions (RMC), a shipbuilding company in Rauma, Finland, started construction of Spirit of Tasmania IV. The shipbuilder will also build Spirit of Tasmania V. TT-Line will introduce updated branding for the new ferries, but will keep the iconic red and white as the colour scheme. The new ferries are due to be delivered by the end of 2023.

On the 23 October 2022, TT-Line moved its Victorian terminal from Station Pier in the Port of Melbourne to the new purpose built Spirit of Tasmania Quay in Geelong.

Localities and ports
 Bell Bay
 Burnie
 Devonport
 Launceston
 Port of Melbourne
 Geelong

Ships

(chronological)
 Black Swan, Royal Shepherd, Havilah and Derwent (1850s to 1870s)
 Mangana and Flinders (from 1879)
 Pateena, Flora and Penguin (1880s)
 SS Burrumbeet (from 1889)
 SS Coogee (1890s)
 SS Pateena
 SS Rotomahana
 SS City of Melbourne
 SS Oonah
 
 
 
 
 MS Bass Trader
 
 
 
 MS Spirit of Tasmania
 HSC Devil Cat

See also
 Transport in Tasmania

References

External links
 
 
 

 
Ferries of Tasmania
Ferries of Victoria (Australia)
Maritime history of Australia